The Red Room is a psychological thriller novel by Nicci French, the pseudonym of English husband-and-wife team Nicci Gerrard and Sean French. It was first published in 2001.

Plot introduction
Kit Quinn is a psychologist who ends up scarred after meeting a troubled arrested man. When she goes back to work after the incident she is asked to review a case for the police, in which the man who scarred her is the main suspect. Against everyone else's suggestions she decides to defend this man, at least until more evidence is found. Her suspicions end up proven and in the end she solves the case in the manner of the most experienced detective (which she is not).

External links
Peter Guttridge. "Mighty Quinn", July 15, 2001.

References
The Red Room at bookarmy.com
The Red Room at fantasticfiction.co.uk

2001 British novels
Psychological thriller novels
Novels by Nicci French
Michael Joseph books